Silent Witness is a 1943 American crime film directed by Jean Yarbrough and written by Martin Mooney. The film stars Frank Albertson, Maris Wrixon, Bradley Page, Evelyn Brent, Milburn Stone and John Sheehan. The film was released on January 15, 1943, by Monogram Pictures.

Plot

Cast          
Frank Albertson as Bruce Strong 
Maris Wrixon as Betty Higgins
Bradley Page as Robert Holden
Evelyn Brent as Mrs. Roos / Anna Barnes
Milburn Stone as Joe Manson
John Sheehan as Dan Callahan
Lucien Littlefield as Hank Eastman
James Eagles as Jockey Carlos 
Patsy Nash as Elsie Jergens
Anthony Warde as Lou Manson
Paul Bryar as Blackie
Jack Mulhall as Jed Kelly
Kenneth Harlan as Tommy Jackson
Harry Harvey Sr. as Monk
Charles Jordan as Mr. Jergens
Robert 'Buzz' Henry as Johnny Jergens
Virginia Carroll as Mrs. Marjorie Miller
Sam McDaniel as Deacon
Olaf Hytten as Sidney
Margaret Armstrong as Mrs. Higgins
Herbert Rawlinson as Benjamin Yeager
Caroline Burke as Nurse
Henry Hall as Judge
John Ince as The Mayor
Joseph Eggenton as Si Ames 
Ace the Wonder Dog as Major

References

External links
 

1943 films
1940s English-language films
American crime films
1943 crime films
Monogram Pictures films
Films directed by Jean Yarbrough
American black-and-white films
1940s American films